Charles Joseph Mathieu Lambrechts (20 November 1753 – 4 August 1825) was a Belgian-born lawyer, rector magnificus of the University of Louvain, who became Minister of Justice of the French Republic, during the Directoire. Later he was a deputy from 1819 to 1824.

Early years

Charles Joseph Mathieu Lambrechts was born in Sint-Truiden, Belgium, on 20 November 1753.
His father was Gilles de Lambrechts, a colonel in the army of the States General of the Netherlands.
He studied civil and canon law at Leuven.
He graduated in 1774, became a professor in 1777 and a doctor in 1782.
He was elected rector of the university in 1786.

In the year 1778 he was initiated to the Lodge  The True and Perfect Harmony  of Mons.

In 1788 the Emperor Joseph II charged Lambrechts with visiting the universities of Germany.
The goal was for him to study legal education in Germany with the promise that when he returned he would be given the chair of public law and international law in Leuven.
The Brabant Revolution (January 1789 – December 1790) upset this plan.
Lambrechts sided with the emperor, left Belgium, and only returned after the restoration of imperial authority.
In 1793 he established himself in Brussels to practice as an attorney.

French Revolution

Lambrechts declared himself a supporter of the Revolution after the French entered Belgium.
He became a municipal officer in Brussels, a member of the central government, then President of the central administration of the Department of Dyle.
In 1797, the French Directory appointed him to replace Merlin de Douai at the Ministry of Justice.
He held this position from 3 Vendémiaire VI (24 Septembre 1797) to 3 Messidor VIII (22 June 1800).
He was a candidate to become a Director when Emmanuel Joseph Sieyès was chosen in place of Jean-François Rewbell.
In January 1798 Lambrechts defined the principles that would be followed in the territories occupied by the French armies, writing that servitude was accompanied by ignorance, and freedom could only come when the people were enlightened. They must therefore learn French in school so they could become virtuous citizens.

After the coup of 18 Brumaire VIII (9 November 1799) when the French Consulate came to power Lambrechts was made a member of the Sénat conservateur.
He was appointed to the Senate on 3 Nivôse VIII (24 December 1799).

Empire

Lambrechts spoke out against Napoleon Bonaparte's accumulation of power, and was one of three senators who voted against establishment of the empire.
Despite this, he was appointed a member of the Legion of Honour on 9 Vendémiaire XII (2 October 1803) and was created Count of the Empire on 13 May 1808.
In 1814 Lambrechts was at the head of the minority, and wrote the preamble to the act of deposition of Napoleon.
He was a member of the commission to prepare a new constitution.
However, King Louis XVIII of France refused to sanction it.
Lambrechts refused to give his oath to the emperor during the Hundred Days.
He retired to private life during the Hundred Days, and did not return to politics until 1819, after the second Bourbon Restoration.

Bourbon Restoration

On 11 September 1819 Lambrechts was elected to the chamber of deputies for two departments.
His health prevented him from appearing except on rare occasions.
Lambrechts died on 4 August 1825. He left part of his fortune to various charitable institutions.

Works

Lambrechts' surviving published works include:

Rapport sur les peines à infliger dans l'armée navale, et dans les ports et arsenaux fait au nom du Comité de la marine Séance du 16 août 1790
Le ministre de la justice aux tribunaux civils, criminels et correctionnels, aux commissaires du Directoire exécutif établis près de ces tribunaux.
Observations d'un citoyen du département des Deux-Nèthes sur les opérations des deux fractions de l'Assemblée électorale du même département 1799|Hacquart

References
Notes

Citations

Sources

1753 births
1825 deaths
People from Sint-Truiden
Members of the Sénat conservateur
French Ministers of Justice